Spinidrupa is a genus of sea snails, marine gastropod mollusks in the subfamily Ergalataxinae of the family Muricidae, the murex snails or rock snails.

Species
Species within the genus Spinidrupa include:

References

 Habe T. & Kosuge S. (1966). Shells of the world in colour, Vol. II. The Tropical Pacific. Osaka: Hoikusha. vii + 193 pp, 68 pls

 
Ergalataxinae
Monotypic gastropod genera